Lincoln McClutchie (born 12 April 1999) is a New Zealand rugby union player, who currently plays as a first five-eighth for  in New Zealand's domestic National Provincial Championship competition and for  in Super Rugby.

Early career

McClutchie attended Hastings Boys' High School, where he played First XV rugby alongside future  teammates Folau Fakatava, Devan Flanders, Danny Toala and Kianu Kereru-Symes. He helped his team to two National Top 4 finals, narrowly losing the first against Mount Albert Grammar School (13 - 14) in 2016, but winning the second against Hamilton Boys' High School 25 to 17 after an undefeated season in 2017.

He played representative rugby for several Hawke's Bay age grade teams, including at U16 level in 2015 and U19 level in 2018.

In 2015, McClutchie was for the first time invited to attend the Hurricanes (U18) Development camp.  Both in 2016 and 2017, he was named in the Hurricanes U18 squad to play the Crusaders U18 team.

Senior career

On 7 August 2017, the Hawke's Bay Rugby Union announced that four players of that year's successful Hastings Boys' High School First XV side, including Lincoln McClutchie, had signed with the union for the 2018 and 2019 seasons.  McClutchie made his Magpies debut on 22 September 2018 against , starting instead of the regular fly-half, Tiaan Falcon, who had suffered an injury in the previous game.

However, despite a second successful season with Hawke's Bay, McClutchie missed out on a contract for the 2020 Super Rugby season.

In November 2019, McClutchie signed with NTT DoCoMo Red Hurricanes Osaka for the 2020 Top League season. Unfortunately, he only played four games for the club. The competition was cancelled after round 6 due to the COVID-19 pandemic and McClutchie returned to New Zealand.

In July 2020, McClutchie re-signed with Hawke's Bay for 2020 and 2021. During the 2020 Mitre 10 Cup season, the Magpies won the Ranfurly Shield (taking it off ), were successful in three more Ranfurly Shield defences (against ,  and ), and won the Mitre 10 Cup Championship, thus securing a well-deserved promotion to the Premiership division. The Magpies held on to the Shield during the entire 2021 Bunnings NPC season, winning all six Ranfurly Shield defences. McClutchie played an important role in his province's success and his efforts paid off.

On 20 October 2021, Moana Pasifika announced that the new franchise had signed McClutchie for the 2022 Super Rugby Pacific season.

International career

In 2016, following his first successful First XV season playing for Hastings Boys' High School, McClutchie was named in the New Zealand Barbarians Schools' team. He captained the team in its first game against Australian Schools, a game the NZ Barbarians Schools' team won 28– 17, with McClutchie scoring one of the tries. After that game, he was promoted to the New Zealand Secondary Schools team and played Australian Schools again, this time coming off the bench. NZ Schools won the game 32 to 22. In the official report of the match series, McClutchie was named as one of the standout performers.

The following year, McClutchie was named in the New Zealand Secondary Schools team for a three-match international series in Australia.  He played in all three games, including a 34 – 11 victory over Australian Schools in which he scored one of the tries.

Reference list

External links
NZ Rugby History profile
Top League 2020 player statistics
Itsrugby.co.uk profile

1999 births
Living people
Ngāti Porou people
People educated at Hastings Boys' High School
New Zealand rugby union players
Rugby union fly-halves
Hawke's Bay rugby union players
NTT DoCoMo Red Hurricanes Osaka players
Moana Pasifika players
Rugby union players from the Hawke's Bay Region